Muesli is a cold breakfast dish, the primary ingredient of which is rolled oats. Most often, additional ingredients such as grains, nuts, seeds, and fresh or dried fruits, are added, along with milk or cream, a squeeze of citrus juice, and honey to add sweetness. Yoghurt or other mammal or plant milk products are now commonly added to both homemade and commercially packaged muesli recipes.

Developed around 1900 by Swiss physician Maximilian Bircher-Benner for patients in his hospital, it is now eaten as a standard breakfast dish, like a breakfast cereal, and in Switzerland also for supper as Birchermüesli complet – muesli with Café complet (milk coffee, accompanied by bread, butter and jam (Butterbrot)).

In addition to being prepared raw, muesli can be toasted. Muesli can also be processed further by adding sweetener and oil to bind the ingredients together and baked to produce granola.

Etymology
Originally known in Swiss German as Birchermüesli after its creator Bircher-Benner or simply Müesli, the word is an Alemannic diminutive of Mues (non-Swiss Standard German: Mus) meaning "mush" or "purée".

History
Muesli was not originally intended as a breakfast food, but as an appetiser similar to bread and butter. It was consumed as Schweizer Znacht (lit.: Swiss supper), but not as a breakfast cereal.

It was introduced around 1900 by Bircher-Benner for patients in his hospital, where a diet rich in fresh fruit and vegetables was an essential part of therapy. It was inspired by a similar "strange dish" that he and his wife had been served on a hike in the Swiss Alps.

Bircher-Benner himself referred to the dish simply as "d'Spys" (Swiss German for "the dish", in German "die Speise"); it was commonly known as Apfeldiätspeise (Apple Diet Meal). Bircher opened a chalet-style sanitorium on Zürichberg called Lebendige Kraft (lit.: lively power). These facilities had risen in popularity during the era of lebensreform, a social movement which valued health foods and vegetarianism.

Recipes

Original Bircher-Benner recipe
The original Bircher-Benner recipe consists of the following ingredients:

 Apples, "two or three small apples or one large one". The whole apple was to be used, including skin, core, and pips.
 Nuts, either walnuts, almonds, or hazelnuts, one tablespoon.
 Rolled oats, one tablespoon, "previously soaked in 3 tablespoons water for 12 hours".
 Lemon juice from half a lemon.
 Either cream and honey or sweetened condensed milk, 1 tablespoon.

The dish was prepared by mixing the cream and honey or condensed milk with the soaked oats and lemon juice and, while stirring, grating the whole apple into the mixture. This method prevented the apple pulp from browning. The intent was to serve the dish fresh, immediately before any other dishes in the meal.

Fresh muesli

Muesli traditionally is freshly prepared using dried rolled oats or whole grain oats that have been soaked in water or fruit juice. Other common ingredients are grated or chopped fresh fruit (e.g., bananas, apples, berries, grapes, mango), dried fruit, milk products (e.g., fresh milk, yoghurt, cream, condensed milk, fromage frais, quark, cottage cheese, or nondairy milk substitutes), lemon juice, ground nuts, seeds, spices (especially cinnamon), honey and muesli mix.

The preparation of home-made muesli varies according to the tastes and preferences of the cook, but the basic proportions are around 80% grain, 10% nuts and seeds and 10% dried fruits. Some home cooks prefer to mix the dry ingredients ahead of time and store a batch of it in a container, adding wet ingredients such as fresh fruit, dairy products, honey and fruit juice immediately before serving.

Packaged muesli

Packaged muesli is a loose mixture of mainly rolled oats or cornflakes together with various dried fruit pieces, nuts, and seeds – the main ingredients of any muesli. It commonly contains other rolled cereal grains such as wheat or rye flakes.

There are many varieties, which may also contain honey, spices, or chocolate. Dry packaged muesli can be kept for many months and served quickly after mixing with milk, filmjölk, yogurt, coffee, hot chocolate, fruit juice or water. If desired, pieces of fresh fruit may be added. Alternatively, the mix may be soaked overnight in milk and then served with fresh fruit or compote to taste.

Cultural specifics

English-speaking world adaptation
Cafes, restaurants and chefs in the English-speaking world often use the label Bircher muesli to distinguish their dishes from the store-bought variety, indicating it has been prepared in a manner based on the original recipe – with grated fresh apple, lemon juice, cream and honey – rather than just being poured from a packet and having milk added. However, these dishes are usually a marked modification of the original recipe rather than a faithful reproduction. Many use orange or apple juice instead of lemon juice, and add other more exotic ingredients such as berries, grated fresh pears, poached or roasted fruit, vanilla essence and agave syrup.

Cultural connotations
Muesli has been associated from the beginning with health-conscious diets and back-to-nature lifestyles. In English-speaking countries, these connotations have led to the coinage of terms linking muesli to social liberalism and the middle classes. These include the British muesli belt and the American granola type.

See also
Muesli belt malnutrition

References

External links

Breakfast cereals
Swiss cuisine
Swiss inventions
Liechtenstein cuisine
Nut dishes
Oat-based dishes